The Philippine Journal of Allied Health Sciences is the official scientific journal of the University of Santo Tomas- College of Rehabilitation Sciences and is published biannually. It is a peer reviewed journal which encourages authors to publish original scholarly articles in the field of human biomechanics, exercise physiology, physical activity in pediatrics and geriatrics, ergonomics, physiologic profiling of athletes, sports injury monitoring, and clinical practice patterns. An 11-year gap between volumes 2 and 3 is due to the difficulty of sustaining enough quality articles for publication in the journal.

List of editors-in-chief
Janine Margarita R. Dizon (2006–2008)
Ivan Neil Gomez (2019–present)

References

External links

Publications established in 2006
English-language journals
Biannual journals
General medical journals